Bulgaria is an industrial district in Cluj-Napoca in Romania, located between a railway and the Someșul Mic River.

Districts of Cluj-Napoca